This List of waterway societies in the United Kingdom is a list of links to waterway societies, charities, trusts, associations, clubs and other non-governmental waterway organisations, concerned with the restoration, regeneration and use of the waterways in the United Kingdom.

A
Accessible Boating Association, Hampshire / Disability
Airedale Boat Club, Yorkshire
Anderton Boat Lift Trust
Anglers Conservation Association
Ashby Canal Association, Leicestershire, Staffordshire
Ashby Canal Trust, Leicestershire, Staffordshire
Association of Nene River Clubs
Association of Rivers Trusts
Association of Waterways Cruising Clubs
Aylesbury Canal Society, Buckinghamshire

B

Barge Association (DBA)
Bedford and Milton Keynes Waterway Trust
Birmingham Canal Navigations Society
Bridge 19-40 Canal Society, Scotland
British Canoe Union (BCU)
Broads Society, Norfolk, Suffolk
Burslem Port Trust - for the restoration of the Burslem arm of the Trent & Mersey Canal.

C

Chester Canal Heritage Trust
Chesterfield Canal Trust, Derbyshire
Friends of the Cromford Canal
Cotswold Canals Trust

D

Derby and Sandiacre Canal Trust, Derbyshire
Disabled Sailors Association, Disability
Dittons Skiff and Punting Club
Droitwich Canals Trust, Worcestershire
Durham College Rowing
Durham University Boat Club

E

East Anglian Waterways Association
Edinburgh Canal Society, Scotland
Edinburgh University Boat Club
Electric Boat Association
English Federation of Disability Sport, Disability
Erewash Canal Preservation and Development Association

F
Forth Canoe Club, Scotland
Forth and Clyde Canal Society, Scotland
Forth Rivers Trust, Scotland
Foxton Inclined Plane Trust, Leicestershire
Friends of the Cromford Canal

G
Glasgow University Boat Club
The Grantham Canal Society
Great Ouse Boating Association (GOBA), Bedfordshire

H

Herefordshire and Gloucestershire Canal Trust
Horseboating Society

I
Inland Waterways Association (IWA), covers England and Wales
Inland Waterways Association of Ireland (IWAI), covers the Republic of Ireland and Northern Ireland
Inland Waterways Protection Society

J
Jesus College Boat Club (Cambridge)
Jesus College Boat Club (Oxford)

K
Kennet and Avon Canal Trust, Wiltshire
Kingston Royals Dragon Boat Racing Club

L

Lancaster Canal Trust, Lancashire, Cumbria
Leeds and Liverpool Canal Society, Lancashire, Yorkshire
Linlithgow Union Canal Society (LUCS), Scotland
Llandaff Rowing Club, Wales

M
Manchester Bolton and Bury Canal Society (MBBC), Greater Manchester
Manchester Canoe Club
Marine Conservation Society
Mariners of Bewl, Kent / Disability
Melton and Oakham Waterways Society
Mersey Basin Campaign
Montgomery Waterway Restoration Trust, Shropshire

N
Nancy Oldfield Trust, Norfolk Broads /  Disability
National Association of Boat Owners (NABO)
National Community Boats Association (NCBA)
Norfolk Heritage Fleet Trust
Norfolk Wherry Trust
Northern Reaches Restoration Group, Lancashire, Cumbria
Nottingham Rowing Club
Nottingham University Boat Club

P
Peter Le Marchant Trust, Leicestershire / Disability
Pocklington Canal Amenity Society

R

Railway and Canal Historical Society
Ribble Link Trust, Lancashire
River Stour Trust
River Weaver Navigation Society
Rivers and Fisheries Trusts of Scotland, Scotland
Royal Canoe Club
Royal Perth Yacht Club
Royal Yachting Association (RYA)

S

Scottish Amateur Rowing Association
Scottish Inland Waterways Association (SIWA), Scotland (now dissolved)
Scottish Waterways Trust
Seagull Trust, Scotland / Disability
Shrewsbury & Newport Canals Trust
Shropshire Union Canal Society Ltd.
Steam Boat Association of Great Britain
St Pancras Cruising Club, London
Stamford Canal Society

T
Thames Valley Skiff Club
The Skiff Club
Towpath Action Group (TAG)

U

University College Boat Club (Durham)
University College London Boat Club
University of London Boat Club

W

Waterway Recovery Group
The Waterways Trust
Welsh Amateur Rowing Association
Wendover Arm Trust
Westcountry Rivers Trust
Wey and Arun Canal Trust
Weymouth and Portland National Sailing Academy
Wherry Yacht Charter Charitable Trust, Norfolk
Whitchurch Waterway Trust
Wilts & Berks Canal Trust
Wooden Canal Boat Society, Greater Manchester
Wraysbury Skiff and Punting Club

Y
York St John University Rowing Club

See also

Waterway society, Waterway restoration
Waterways in the United Kingdom
List of navigation authorities in the United Kingdom
List of rivers of England
List of rivers of Scotland
List of rivers of Wales
List of rivers of Ireland
Canals of Great Britain
Canals of Ireland
History of the British canal system

Waterways organisations in the United Kingdom
Clubs and societies in the United Kingdom
Transport charities based in the United Kingdom